The 2004 European Parliament election in Slovenia was the election of MEP representing Slovenia constituency for the 2004-2009 term of the European Parliament. It was part of the wider 2004 European election. The vote took place on 13 June.

The biggest surprise was the victory of the New Slovenia – Christian People's Party over the Liberal Democracy of Slovenia and the defeat of the Slovene People's Party, which did not win a seat. The parties on the right of centre that form the opposition in the Slovenian national parliament won this election.

Results

Slovenia
European Parliament elections in Slovenia
2004 in Slovenia